Halticus apterus is a species of plant bug in the family Miridae. It is found in Africa, Europe and Northern Asia (excluding China), and North America. It has a variety of hosts including many Fabaceae and Galium plants.

References

Further reading

 

Miridae
Articles created by Qbugbot
Bugs described in 1758
Taxa named by Carl Linnaeus